Dark Fields may refer to:

 Darkfield, Logitek's name for a type of sensor used on an optical mouse
 Dark field, a type of illumination used in dark field microscopy
 The Dark Fields , a 2001 novel by Alan Glynn
 Dark Fields (2006 film), a horror film directed by Mark McNabb and Al Randall
 Dark Fields (2009 film), a horror film directed by Douglas Shulze
 The Dark Fields, the original name of the 2011 film Limitless, based on the novel
 Dark Fields (album), a 1997 album by Show of Hands

See also 
 Dark (disambiguation)
 Field (disambiguation)